This is the first edition of the tournament.
Anastasiya Yakimova won the tournament by defeating 5th seed Angelique Kerber 6–3, 6–2 in the final.

Seeds

Main draw

Finals

Top half

Bottom half

References
 Main draw
 Qualifying draw

The Bahamas Women's Open - Singles